Dear... is the second Japanese album (third overall) by The Grace released on January 9, 2009. The album consists of nine tracks with the title track "Sukoshi de Ikara (少しでいいから) (A Little Bit of Good)" being used as a soundtrack song for the movie Subaru and also includes their seventh single tracks, "Here" and "Near: Thoughtful 1220". It also marked their last release as a group prior to halting their activities in 2010.

The album peaked #14 on Oricon daily album charts and #37 on the Oricon weekly album charts, charted for 3 weeks and sold 4,734 copies, making it their most successful Japanese album at the time.

Track listing

CD
"Here" 
"Sukoshi de Ikara (少しでいいから)"
"Stand Up People"
"I Don't Know What To Do"
"Party"
"Tenjou no Melody (天上のメロディー; Celestial Melody)"
"Near: Thoughtful 1220"
"Doushite... (どうして・・・; Why)"
"Epilogue"

DVD
"Sukoshi de Ikara (少しでいいから)" 
"Near: Thoughtful 1220" 
"Here" 
"Stand Up People" 

Bonus video clips
"One More Time, OK?" 
"Piranha" 
"Juicy Love" 
"Sweet Flower" 
"The Club" 
"Boomerang"

Album review
Known as “The Grace” in Korea and “Tenjo Chiki” in Japan, the pop group consists of So. California girl Stephanie, Sunday (who released CD singles in Japan back in 2004-2005), Dana (released two solo albums in Korea) and Lina (member of Korea's IsakNJiyeon).  Women who are from the SM Town label that their fellow music artists who have had careers in Japan such as S.E.S. Fly to the Sky and DBSK (Tohoshinki).
The four return with their second full-length album titled “Dear…” which includes their sixth CD single “Stand Up People” and seventh single “Here” and instead of going for an all upbeat pop sound, the group experiments with a few different style of music throughout the album.

The album kicks off with "Here" featuring an upbeat pop track collaborating with rap group Cliff Edge (feat. Jun, Shin and DJ Georgia).  A catchy track and was a solid single from the group.  Music is by U-Key zone.

The second track "Sukoshi de iikara" is a piano-driven ballad and showcases the harmony of the group.  An elegant and enjoyable slow jam.
The third track "Stand Up People" is the group's sixth CD single and is a jazzy/funky pop track and very much different from their previous releases but overall a lively track.  Featuring lyrics by Yoko Hiji and rap lyrics by Stephanie and music by Ryuichiro Yamaki.
The fourth track "I Don't Know What to Do" is probably my favorite pop track on the album.  Upbeat with a catchy pop groove that showcases the group's vocals.  An enjoyable track overall.  Featuring lyrics by H.U.B. and music by Philip Hochstrate, Drew Milligan, Dele Ladmeiji and Sarah West.

The fifth track "Party" is a mid-tempo track that tries to balance electric guitar (synth) and pop beats.  A funky track that is probably my least-favorite track on the album.  Featuring lyrics by Sunday and music by fink bro.
The sixth track is titled "Tenjo no Melody" featuring an upbeat track with lyrics by Lina and Dana.  An upbeat track that showcases the group's vocals.  But a pretty tame song.

The seventh track is titled "Near: Thoughtful 1220" and features narration by Stephanie and music by the fink bro.  A pop mid-tempo track with a smooth groove and features Stephanie speaking in English with a few narrations throughout the song.  The song is about loving someone but because during a fight, the person you love is not contacting you back and the feeling of loneliness.
The eight track "Doushite" is an upbeat track with lyrics by Sunday and Stephanie.  Pretty cool melody with a piano lead-in and awesome harmony and vocals.  A very awesome track on the album!

The final track "Epilogue" is an instrumental by U-key zone.

Perhaps the part that makes this album so worth it is the accompanying DVD release.  The DVD features ten of their music videos which include their past music videos (which were included in their first album “Graceful4″).

The first music video "Sukoshi Dakara" features the women driving through the country in an old car singing the song and then also featuring the girls looking elegant as they sing the song around many lamps.  The music video was directed by Shigeaki Kubo.
The second music video is for "Near: Thoughtful 1220" and features the women on the phone of the girls looking lonely and waiting for a call on their cell phone.  A pretty cool music video with cool shots of each women singing.  The music video is directed by Exflare.
The third music video is for "Here" and features the women as music box figurines and come to life after a girl winds up the music box.  Features Cliff Edge rapping in the video.

The fourth music video "Stand Up People" features a music video featuring the women dancing and showcasing the group's sexy choreography in their gold club mini skirts and then other scene with them in fashionable clothing performing the song.
And as mentioned, the music videos featured on “Graceful4″ are bonus video tracks on this DVD.
The first bonus music video "One More Time OK?" features the women showcasing their vocals and dance moves with a group of guys and girls grooving to the music with a few race cars in the background. If anything, the video is a good showcase of beauty, sexy choreography (especially a cool segment with the girls dancing with the cane) and their vocals.  Directed by Shigeki Kubo.
The second bonus music video "Piranha" is a music video that just screams “Sexy Choreography”. If you thought Koda Kumi's music video were sexy, this video will show you that Tenjochiki embodies sexy with their choreography for this video. Looking at the previous music videos from Tenjochiki, you can see how far they came in the past year in terms of style and choreography.  My favorite video from the group that is directed by Shigeki Kubo.
The third bonus music video on the DVD is "Juicy Love" has that summer, breezy feel to it. The women sing in Summer colors with tropical plants in the background and then a transition to Cornhead's rapping segment showcases a precursor to the beginning of the women's cool choreography before "Piranha".  Directed by Kansuke Kawamura.

The fourth bonus music video featured is "Sweet Flower". Features the women before they died their hair lighter and yes, they look different from their music videos now. Cool choreography but again, a precursor to the talent they would become two singles later.  The music video is directed by Katsunari Ito.

The fifth music video "The Club" features a very cool music v ideo featuring the girls in different segments. The girls arguing with their manager in a limo, sitting in a round table singing to each other and another shot singing and dancing and performing in front of people. A very short appearance by Seamo.  Directed by Katsunari Ito.

The sixth music video is their first song "Boomerage" featuring the ladies performing and if anything, I think this video showcases the group's vocals and dancing. In a way, it looks like a modern-day MAX and a pretty cool video and definitely interesting to see how the women were image-wise before the transformation to the current style (fashion and choreography) they exhibit now.  Directed by Ippe-Morita.

The CD insert booklet features the lyrics to the songs, the production credits and photos of each member.  Also, included is a flier for upcoming Rhythm Zone releases.

External links
  Official Website
 Official Website

References

2009 albums
The Grace (band) albums